Tryptophan pyrrolase may refer to:

 Tryptophan 2,3-dioxygenase, an enzyme
 Indoleamine 2,3-dioxygenase, an enzyme